Valeriy Vladimirovich Troshin (9 March 1970) is a Soviet and Russian film and theater actor.

Biography 
Valeriy Troshin was born in Moscow. His mother was a doctor, his father - a teacher of physics. He became interested in theater thanks to his father, who is always engaged in amateur and arranged for the family the whole presentation. Valeriy also devoted much time to the visual arts, graphic and technical design.

As a child, he participated in theatrical productions mug.

He graduated from the Moscow Art Theatre School in 1996 (course Lev Durov) and was admitted to the troupe Moscow Art Theatre.

Since 2010, Valery Troshin director and teacher in the workshop Nikolay  Skorik.

Awards 
 2004 - Laureate of the State Prize of the Russian Federation
 2006 - The honorary title of Honored Artist of Russia
 2010 - Winner of the VIII International Theatre Forum  Golden Knight  silver certificate  Best Actor

Filmography 
 1987 - Visit to Minotaur
 1987 - Slap, which was not
 1989 - Name
 1989 - Do It — One!
 1989 - Glass labyrinth
 1989 - 100 Days Before the Command
 1996 - Klubnichka
 2000 - Demobbed
 2001 - 101-km
 2001 - Family Secrets
 2002 - Marsh Turetskogo
 2002 - Brigada
 2002 - Antikiller
 2004 - The Long Goodbye
 2005 - The White Guard
 2005-2006 - Luba, children and the plant
 2007 - Liquidation
 2007 - Law & Order: Department of operative investigations
 2008 - Univer
 2011 - Made in the USSR
 2013 - Miracle Worker

Personal life 
Actor divorced, has a daughter and a son.

References

External links
 
 Валерий Трошин на сайте Мастерской Н. Л. Скорика
 Валерий Трошин на сайте МХТ им. Чехова

1970 births
Living people
Soviet male film actors
Russian male film actors
Russian male television actors
Russian male stage actors
Male actors from Moscow
Honored Artists of the Russian Federation
State Prize of the Russian Federation laureates
Moscow Art Theatre School alumni